Bhong (Urdu, and ) is a small town of Rahim Yar Khan District in the Punjab province of Pakistan. It is a Union Council of Sadiqabad tehsil (Urdu for subdistrict) and is located 200 kilometres away from Bhawalpur at 28° 25' 0" North, 69° 55' 0" East.

References

Populated places in Rahim Yar Khan District